Purog Kangri Glacier (普若岗日冰川), near  Purog Kangri Peak (reported at 6,482 m or 6,435 m) has been reported as the world's largest "third largest glacier" (i.e. the largest outside the two polar regions), at 422 km2 as of 2009, but reportedly melting at "an accelerated rate" (Xinhua).

References 

Glaciers of China
Glaciers of Tibet